Fuenzalida is a surname. Notable people with the surname include:

Humberto Fuenzalida (1904–1966), Chilean geographer, geologist and paleontologist
Orozimbo Fuenzalida (1925–2013), Chilean Roman Catholic bishop
José Pedro Fuenzalida (born 1985), Chilean footballer
Ricardo Fuenzalida (born 1992), Chilean footballer